The 2007 Norwegian Football Cup Final took place at Ullevaal Stadion in Oslo on 11 November 2007. The match was contested between heavy favorites Lillestrøm and underdogs Haugesund. 

With Lillestrøm played in the top tier Tippeligaen and Haugesund in the second tier Adeccoligaen, the Norwegian media dubbed Lillestrøm the biggest favorites to win the cup final since Rosenborg met Fyllingen in 1990. Haugesund surprisingly made it to the cup final, becoming the first team outside Tippeligaen in 10 years to reach the final. However, players from Haugesund admitted to having been lucky with the draw in both the quarterfinals and semifinals, where Haugesund avoided the big clubs.

Route to the final

Match

Details

References

2007
Lillestrøm SK matches
FK Haugesund matches
Football Cup
Sports competitions in Oslo
November 2007 sports events in Europe
2000s in Oslo
Final